Rally Tissera (born 14 December 1978) is a Sri Lankan former cricketer. He played in 60 first-class and 39 List A matches between 1999/00 and 2006/07. He made his Twenty20 debut on 17 August 2004, for Tamil Union Cricket and Athletic Club in the 2004 SLC Twenty20 Tournament.

References

External links
 

1978 births
Living people
Sri Lankan cricketers
Nondescripts Cricket Club cricketers
Tamil Union Cricket and Athletic Club cricketers
Place of birth missing (living people)